The name Soyombo is derived from the Sanskrit word Svayambhu (meaning "created out of itself").  

Soyombo may refer to:

 Soyombo alphabet, an abugida developed by Zanabazar in 1686 to write Mongolian
 Soyombo symbol, a special character of that script and national symbol of Mongolia
 Soyombo movie theater, a movie theater/cinema of Mongolia
 Soyombo (Unicode block), range of characters defined in the Unicode Standard for the Soyombo script